The  is a Shintō shrine in the Ichinomiya neighborhood of the city of Fuefuki in Yamanashi Prefecture, Japan. It is one of two shrines which vie for the total of ichinomiya of former Kai Province. The main festival of the shrine is held annually on April 15. It is also known as simply the

Enshrined kami

History
The foundation of the Ichinomiya Asama Jinja predates the historical period. Per shrine tradition, it was established in reign of the semi-legendary Emperor Suinin (reigned 29 BC – 70 AD) with the shrine first built on its current location in 865 AD. Per the Nihon Sandai Jitsuroku, this was a period of intense volcanic activity on Mount Fuji, and the shrine was built in order to appease the kami of the mountain. The shrine is located near the site of the provincial temple of Kai Province, the Kai Kokubun-ji and the provincial capital during the Nara and Heian periods. Through the Sengoku period, the Takeda clan patronized of the shrine, and its extensive land holdings in central Kai Province were confirmed by Tokugawa Ieyasu after the start of the Tokugawa shogunate. The current Haiden of the shrine was built in 1672 and is a Tangible Culturalproperty of Fuefuki city.

The shrine is a 60-minute walk (or 10-minute car ride) from Yamanashishi Station on the JR East Chūō Main Line.

Gallery

Cultural Properties

Important Cultural Properties
, Sengoku period. In 1541, Emperor Go-Nara planned to dedicate a copy of the Heart Sutra to each ichinomiya in the country to pray for peace. The dedication was actually carried out in 24 countries, of which seven copies are known to still exist. The one at the Asama Jinja was brought to this shrine in 1550, and was dedicated Takeda Shingen. It was designated an Important Cultural Property in 1905.

, late Muromachi period. The Yamamiya Jinja is a subsidiary shrine located some distance outside the main shrine compound. The Honden of this shrine was constructed in 1558 and was designated an Important Cultural Property in 1907.

See also
 List of Shinto shrines
 Ichinomiya
 Asama Shrine
 Ichinomiya Sengen Jinja

References

External links

Official site of the shrine
Fuefuki official tourism site
Omiyukisan festival

Beppyo shrines
Shinto shrines in Yamanashi Prefecture
Fuefuki, Yamanashi
Kai Province
Ichinomiya
9th-century establishments in Japan